Kirchbach (Slovenian: Cirkno) is a market town in the Hermagor district in the Austrian state of Carinthia.

Geography
It lies in the upper Gailtal valley between the Gailtal Alps in the north and the Carnic Alps in the south, which also constitute the Italian border.

References

Cities and towns in Hermagor District
Gailtal Alps
Carnic Alps